The 5th Gujarat Legislative Assembly election was held in 1975.  Indian National Congress (INC) won 75 seats out of 168 seats. While, NCO won 56 seats, BJS won 18 seats and KLP won 12 seats. INC underperformed in this election and lost 65 seats.  

A total of 834 men and 14 women contested the election. Total 178 men and 3 women won in the elections. The number of polling stations was 18,719 and the number of electors per polling station was 747.

Results

Elected members

References

State Assembly elections in Gujarat
1970s in Gujarat
Gujarat